Ceroplesini is a tribe of longhorn beetles of the subfamily Lamiinae. It was described by Thomson in 1860.

Taxonomy
 Ceroplesis Audinet-Serville, 1835
 Cochliopalpus Lacordaire, 1872
 Diastocera Dejean, 1835
 Gnathoenia Thomson, 1858
 Mimoceroplesis Breuning, 1967
 Paranaleptes Breuning, 1937
 Pterotragus Chevrolat, 1856
 Pycnopsis Thomson, 1857
 Thysia J. Thomson, 1860
 Titoceres Audinet-Serville, 1835

References

 
Lamiinae